Old Bridgeville Fire House is a historic fire station located in Bridgeville, Sussex County, Delaware.  It was built in 1911, and is a two-story, rectangular, concrete brick structure in a vernacular style. The building measures 25 feet wide by 35 feet deep. It has a gable roof and features corner pilasters, a segmentally arched window and door openings, and a simple cupola-bell tower. After the fire company sold the building in 1928, it was used for many years for storage until it was acquired by the Bridgeville Historical Society in 1977.

It was added to the National Register of Historic Places in 1984.

References

Fire stations on the National Register of Historic Places in Delaware
Government buildings completed in 1911
Buildings and structures in Sussex County, Delaware
1911 establishments in Delaware
National Register of Historic Places in Sussex County, Delaware
Individually listed contributing properties to historic districts on the National Register in Delaware
Historical societies in Delaware